Pash may refer to:
 Pash-e Olya
 Pash-e Sofla